St. Peter Cathedral is a Roman Catholic church located at 230 West 10th Street (at Sassafras Street) in Erie, Pennsylvania.

History
Plans for the building of St. Peter Cathedral were initiated in 1873 by Bishop Tobias Mullen of the Roman Catholic Diocese of Erie. The cornerstone was laid in a formal ceremony held on St. Peter in Chains Day (See General Roman Calendar as in 1954), 1 August 1875. After years of construction and a fundraising campaign that involved parishes throughout the diocese, the cathedral was completed in 1893.  The architect was Patrick Keeley of Brooklyn, a prolific designer of churches whose works include 21 cathedrals in the eastern United States.

Specifications

The cathedral is Gothic revival in the French Victorian tradition called Second Empire. Much of the stone for the foundation came from dismantling the locks of the Erie Extension Canal, which closed in 1871. The exterior consists of red sandstone from Medina, New York and white sandstone trim from Amherst, Ohio and Mercer County, Pennsylvania.

The bell tower contains a chime of twelve bells weighing 14 tons cast in 1903 by the Andrew Meneely Bell Foundry of West Troy, New York. The E. Howard Clock Company of Boston, New York, and Chicago, installed the clock in the tower, also in 1903.

The stained glass in the sanctuary and transept was installed by the Franz Mayer firm of Munich, Germany and includes depictions of the Annunciation, the Birth of Jesus, the Crucifixion, the Resurrection, the Ascension, and the Second Coming. Large side windows show the Conferral of Keys to Saint Peter and Jesus' supper at the house of the Publican. There are also stained glass windows of the Life of St. Peter and four of the Western Doctors of the Church. Renovations in 1992-1993 included the resetting of all the stained glass and the installation of many glass prisms to refocus sunlight into the interior.

The cathedral organ, which expresses a great variety of organ timbres in the French tradition, was built by Casavant Frères of Montreal, Quebec, Canada and installed in 1977. Additions were made in 1999. It is the third instrument since the building was built.

From the nave of the church, one can see a collection of the likenesses of the diocese's nine bishops and Auxiliary Bishop Edward P. McManaman, who served as Cathedral Rector from 1936 to 1948.

The cathedral has a new baptistery. The center aisle is of Spanish and Italian marble. Carved onto the marble at the front of the church is the large seal to the Diocese of Erie with the coats of arms of Pope Leo XIII and Bishop Mullen on the right and those of Pope John Paul II and Bishop Trautman on the left.

The sanctuary area contains the altar, with the reliquary chest beneath it, and the Bishop's cathedra and the pulpit (strictly "ambo") for preaching. The Blessed Sacrament is maintained in the tabernacle on the north side of the cathedral. The marble high altar constructed in 1911 was used until liturgical changes were made after the Second Vatican Council in the 1960s.

The all-boys high school Cathedral Preparatory School is located behind the cathedral, hence the name. In its early years, classes were held in the cathedral's rooms.

See also
List of Catholic cathedrals in the United States
List of cathedrals in the United States

References

External links

 Official Cathedral Site
 Roman Catholic Diocese of Erie Official Site
 Bates History of Erie County, Part III, Chapter IV

Roman Catholic Diocese of Erie
Peter Cathedral, Erie
Patrick Keely buildings
Churches in Erie, Pennsylvania
Churches in Erie County, Pennsylvania
Tourist attractions in Erie, Pennsylvania